A. Prabhakaran (born 15 May 1952) is an Indian politician serving as the MLA of Malampuzha Constituency since May 2021.

References 

Kerala MLAs 2021–2026
Communist Party of India (Marxist) politicians from Kerala
1952 births
Living people